Sir John Byron (1562–1623) of Colwick and Newstead, Nottinghamshire, and Clayton, Lancashire, was a Member of Parliament for Nottinghamshire in 1597.

Byron was the son of Sir John Byron (died 1600) and his wife Alice Strelley.  He married Margaret FitzWilliam, daughter of Sir William FitzWilliam of Gaynes Park.  They had 5 sons and 5 daughters. Among his sons was another Sir John Byron, whose own sons, John and Richard became Barons Byron.

References
 

1562 births
1623 deaths
English MPs 1597–1598
17th-century English people
English knights
John
People from Newstead, Nottinghamshire
People from Colwick